24-Dehydrocholesterol reductase is a protein that in humans is encoded by the DHCR24 gene.

This gene encodes a flavin adenine dinucleotide (FAD)-dependent oxidoreductase, which catalyzes the reduction of the delta-24 double bond of sterol intermediates during cholesterol biosynthesis. The protein contains a leader sequence that directs it to the endoplasmic reticulum membrane. Missense mutations in this gene have been associated with desmosterolosis. Also, reduced expression of the gene occurs in the temporal cortex of Alzheimer disease patients and overexpression has been observed in adrenal gland cancer cells.

Model organisms

Model organisms have been used in the study of DHCR24 function. A conditional knockout mouse line, called Dhcr24tm1a(EUCOMM)Wtsi was generated as part of the International Knockout Mouse Consortium program — a high-throughput mutagenesis project to generate and distribute animal models of disease to interested scientists.

Male and female animals underwent a standardized phenotypic screen to determine the effects of deletion. Twenty-six tests were carried out on mutant mice and two significant abnormalities were observed. Few homozygous mutant embryos were identified during gestation, and none survived until weaning. The remaining tests were carried out on heterozygous mutant adult mice and no further abnormalities were observed.

See also
 Steroidogenic enzyme

References

External links

Further reading

Human proteins
Genes mutated in mice